A by-election was held in the New South Wales state electoral district of Murray on 22 September 1917. The by-election was triggered by the death  of Robert Scobie.

Dates

Results

Robert Scobie died.

See also
Electoral results for the district of Murray
List of New South Wales state by-elections

Notes

References

New South Wales state by-elections
1917 elections in Australia
1910s in New South Wales